TAS – Transportes Aéreos Salvador Ltda. was a Brazilian airline founded in 1949. In 1962 it was sold and incorporated to Sadia Transportes Aéreos.

History 
TAS was founded in 1949 as a non-scheduled carrier and flights started in 1950. In 1952 it was authorized to operate regular flights.

In 1955 Panair do Brasil tried to purchase the airline in order to increase its presence in Bahia but the transaction was not successful. Shortly after TAS changed its judicial status to S.A. (corporation) and the acronym was changed to TASSA. In September 1955 Transportes Aéreos Nacional became the controller of the airline.

In 1962 TASSA was sold to Sadia Transportes Aéreos and incorporated by this airline.

Destinations 
TAS served locations within Bahia.

Fleet

See also 

List of defunct airlines of Brazil

References

External links 
TAS accidents as per Aviation Safety Database

Defunct airlines of Brazil
Airlines established in 1949
Airlines disestablished in 1962
Companies based in Bahia
1949 establishments in Brazil